David Skinner may refer to:

 David Skinner (journalist) (born 1973), journalist and editor of Humanities magazine and previously of The Weekly Standard
 David Skinner (cricketer) (1920–1998), English cricketer
 David Skinner (producer) (born 1946), American film producer
 David Skinner (musician), British musician and songwriter
 David Skinner (musicologist) (born 1964), Director of Music at Sidney Sussex, Cambridge, and founder of Alamire
 David E. Skinner II (1920–1988), shipping heir and philanthropist in Seattle, Washington
 David Arthur Skinner (born 1980), British pianist, bandleader, and composer